The following is a list of compositions by Tomáš Svoboda restricted to the works of his that have been published.

Orchestral works 

 Concerto for Marimba & Orchestra, Op.148 (1995)
 Concerto for Violin & Orchestra, Op.77 (1975)
 Concerto No. 1 for Piano & Orchestra, Op.71 (1974)
 Concerto No. 2 for Piano & Orchestra, Op.134 (1989)
 Dance Suite for Orchestra, Op.128 (1987)
 Ex Libris for Orchestra, Op.113 (1983)
 Festive Overture for Orchestra, Op.103 (1981–82)
 Nocturne (Cosmic Sunset) for Orchestra, Op.100 (1980–81)
 Overture of the Season for Orchestra, Op.89 (1978)
 Reflections for Orchestra, Op.53 (1968)
 Remembrance - Chorale for Trumpet & Orchestra, Op.152a (1997)
 Serenade for Orchestra, Op.115 (1984)
 Sinfonietta (à la Renaissance) for Orchestra, Op.60 (1972)
 Spring Overture for Orchestra, Op.172 (2002)
 Swing Dance for Orchestra, Op.135a (1992)
 Symphony No. 1 (of Nature), Op.20 for Orchestra (1956–57)
 Symphony No. 2 for Orchestra, Op.41 (1963–64)
 Symphony No. 3 for Organ & Orchestra, Op.43 (1965)
 Symphony No. 4 (Apocalyptic) for Orchestra, Op.69 (1975)
 Symphony No. 5 (in Unison) for Orchestra, Op.92 (1978)
 Symphony No. 6 for Clarinet & Orchestra, Op.137 (1991)
 Three Cadenzas for Piano & Orchestra, Op.135 (1990)
 Three Pieces for Orchestra, Op.45 (1966)

Orchestral works (with voices) 

 Child's Dream - Cantata for Children's Choir & Orchestra, Op.66 (1973)
 Journey - Cantata for Mezzo-soprano, Baritone, Choir & Orchestra, Op.127 (1987)

Works for chamber orchestra 

 Baroque Suite for Bassoon, Harpsichord & String Orchestra, Op.39 (1962)
 Chorale from 15th Century, for English Horn & Strings, Op.52f (1949–78) (arr.1993)
 Concertino for Harp & Chamber Orchestra, Op.34 (1961)
 Concerto for Chamber Orchestra (Returns), Op.125 (1986)
 Concerto No. 1 for Piano & Orchestra, Op.71 (1974)
 Meditation for Oboe and Strings, Op.143 (1993)
 Oriental Echoes for String Orchestra, Op.140 (1992)
 Prelude & Fugue for String Orchestra, Op.67 (1974)
 Six Variations for Violin & String Orchestra, Op.32 (1961)

Works for large ensemble 

 Celebration of Life - Cantata on Aztec Poetry, Op.80 (1976)
 Concertino for Oboe, Brass Choir & Timpani, Op.46 (1966)

Vocal/choral works 

 Aria for Soprano and 4 Instruments, Op.153 (1996)
 Chorale Without Words for Mixed Choir & Piano, Op. 91a (1984)
 Czernogorsk Fugue for Choir, Op.14 (1956; rev. ?)
 Festival for Men's Choir, Op.129b (1987)
 Separate Solitude for Choir & Two Clarinets, Op.64 (1973)
 Veritas Veritatum for Men's Choir, Op.129a (1987)

Works for ensemble (5 or more players) 

 Baroque Quintet for Flute, Oboe, Clarinet, Cello & Piano coperto, Op.37 (1962)
 Brass Quintet, Op.112 (1983)
 Chorale in E flat for Piano Quintet (homage to Aaron Copland), Op.118 (1985)
 Concerto for Woodwind Quintet, Op.111 (1983–97)
 Farewell Matinee for Brass Quintet, Op.160 (1997)
 Intrata for Brass Quintet, Op.127a (1987)
 Suite for Piano and 5 Percussionists, Op.83 (1977)

Chamber works (duos, trios, quartets) 

 Ballade for Bassoon & Piano, Op.35 (1961)
 Baroque Trio for Vibraphone, Electric Guitar & Piano, Op.109 (1982)
 Chorale from 15th Century for Flute & Piano, Op.52b (1993)
 Classical Sonatine for Oboe and Piano, Op.28 (1960)
 Concerto for Marimba & Orchestra (Marimba/Piano Reduction), Op.148a (1995)
 Confession - One Movement for Clarinet, Op.122 (1985)
 Conversations for Two Clarinets, Op.157 (1997)
 Divertimento for Piano & Timpani, Op.16 (1956)
 Dreams of a Dancer for Flute, Clarinet & Piano, Op.164 (1999)
 Duo Concerto for Trumpet & Organ, Op.152 (1997)
 Duo for Clarinet B flat & Cello, Op.50 (1967)
 Duo for Xylophone & Marimba, Op.141 (1993)
 Five Studies for Two Timpanists, Op.88 (1978)
 Forest Rhythms for Flute, Viola & Xylophone, Op.150 (1995)
 March of the Puppets for Guitar, Xylophone & 4-Temple Blocks, Op.95 (1979)
 Morning Prayer for Four Percussion, Op.101 (1981)
 Neo-Renaissance Trio for Ob (Fl or Vl), Vla & Vcl, Op.131a (1987)
 Nocturne for Organ, 4-hand, Op.155 (1996)
 Partita in D for Viola da Gamba & Harpsichord, Op.161 (1998)
 Passacaglia & Fugue for Violin, Cello & Piano, Op.87 (1978–81)
 Phantasy for Violin, Cello & Piano, Op.120 (1985)
 Quartet for Four French Horns, Op.145 (1993)
 Recessional March for Two Percussionists, Op.59 (1974)
 Six Fragments for Woodwind Trio (Ob., Clar. & Bsn.), Op.131 (1987)
 Six Variations for Violin & Piano (String Orchestra), Op.32a (1961)
 Sonata for Clarinet & Piano, Op.167 (2000)
 Sonata for Viola & Piano, Op.36 (1961)
 Sonata for Violin & Piano, Op.73 (1974–84)
 Sonatine for Flute, Clarinet and Piano, Op.154 (1996)
 Storm Session for Electric Guitar & Bass Guitar, Op.126 (1987)
 String Quartet No. 1, Op.29 (1960)
 String Quartet No. 2, Op.151 (1996)
 Suite for Piano, 4-hands, Op.124 (1985)
 Summer Trio for Oboe, Clarinet and Bassoon, Op.159 (1997)
 Theme & Variations for Flute, Clarinet & Piano, Op.142 (1992)
 Three Fughettas for Piano, 4 hands, Op.12 (1956)
 Trio (van Gogh) for Violin, Cello & Piano, Op.116 (1984)

Works for solo instrument 

 Autumn for Koto, Op.110 (1982–83)
 Confession - One Movement for Clarinet, Op.122 (1985)
 Discernment of Time for Gong Solo, Op.74 (1975)
 Folk Dance for Clarinet, Op.132 (1988)
 Pastorale for Flute, Op.78 (1975)
 Scherzo for Bassoon, Op.104 (1982)
 Sonata for Guitar, Op.99 (1980)
 Suite for Cello, Op.147 (1994)
 Suite for Guitar, Op.102 (1981)
 Toccatino for Oboe, Op.114 (1984)
 Wedding Dance for Marimba, Op.138a (1991)

Works for solo keyboard instruments 

 A Bird for Piano, Op.1 (1949)
 Autumn for Piano, Op.110a (1982–83)
 Bagatelles "In a Forest" for Piano, Op.42 (1964–65)
 Benedictus for Piano, Op.162 (1998)
 Children's Treasure Box, Vol. I, for Piano, Op.81 (1977)
 Children's Treasure Box, Vol. II, for Piano, Op.86 (1978)
 Children's Treasure Box, Vol. III, for Piano, Op.90 (1978)
 Children's Treasure Box, Vol. IV, for Piano, Op.91 (1978)
 Eulogy, for Piano, Op.146 (1994)
 Farewell to Prague for Piano, Op.165 (1999)
 Four Waltzes for Piano, Op.68 (1974)
 Fugue in c-minor (on a Theme by Bach), for Piano, Op.9 (1955)
 Fugue in d-minor (on Bulgarian National Anthem), for Piano, Op.17 (1955)
 Nine Etudes in Fugue Style (Vol. I), for Piano, Op.44 (1965–66)
 Nine Etudes in Fugue Style (Vol. II), for Piano, Op.98 (1980–84)
 Nocturne for Piano, Op.84 (1977)
 Offertories for Organ (Vol. I), Op.52a (1949–96)
 Prelude in g-minor for Piano, Op.3a (1954)
 Quiet Piece for Piano, Op.63 (1973)
 Sonata No. 2 for Piano, Op.121 (1985)
 Sonatina for Piano, Op.123 (1985)
 Suite for Harpsichord, Op.105 (1982)
 Troika in Taiga for Piano, Op.21 (1956)
 Wedding March for Organ, Op.94 (1979)

See also
 Orchestral Works by Tomas Svoboda (Oregon Symphony, 2003)

References

Svoboda, Tomas